De Saedeleer is a surname. Notable people include:

 Alexandre De Saedeleer, a Belgian field hockey player
 Henri De Saedeleer (fl.1920s), a naturalist
 Rik De Saedeleer (1924–2013), a Belgian football player, columnist and sports commentator
 Valerius de Saedeleer (1867–1941), a Belgian landscape painter